In computer science, alternating-time temporal logic, or ATL, is a branching-time temporal logic that extends computation tree logic (CTL) to multiple players. ATL naturally describes computations of multi-agent systems and multiplayer video games. Quantification in ATL is over program-paths that are possible outcomes of games. ATL uses alternating-time formulas to construct model-checkers in order to address problems such as receptiveness, realizability, and controllability.

Examples 
In ATL, we can write logical formulas such as  that expresses the fact that agents a and b have a strategy to ensure that the property p holds in the future, whatever the other agents of the system are performing.

Extensions and variants 
ATL* is the extension of ATL, as CTL* extends CTL. ATL* allows to write more complex temporal objectives, for instance . Belardinelli et al. proposes a variant of ATL on finite traces. ATL has been extended with context, in order to store the current strategies played by the agents. ATL* is extended by strategy logic.

ATL has been generalized to include epistemic features. In 2003, van der Hoek and Woodridge proposed ATEL: the logic ATL augmented with an epistemic operator from epistemic logic. In 2004, Pierre-Yves Schobbens proposed variants of ATL with imperfect recall.

In ATL we cannot express properties about individual objectives. That is why, in 2010, Chatterjee, Henzinger and Piterman introduced strategy logic, a first-order logic in which strategies are first-order citizens. Strategy logic subsumes both ATL and ATL*.

See also
 Linear temporal logic

References

Logic in computer science
Modal logic